Cherepon (Chiripon, Chiripong, Kyiripong), or Okere, is a Guang language spoken by 111,000 in Ghana.
Notable people from this tribe are "aponkyethegoat" an alias for Kobina Larbi, the guy who edited this page and ancestors spoke this language

References

Guang languages
Languages of Ghana